The willpower paradox is the idea that people may do things better by focusing less directly on doing them, implying that the direct exertion of volition may not always be the most powerful way to accomplish a goal.

Research suggests that intrapersonal communication (talking to oneself) and maintaining a questioning mind are more likely to bring change.

This phenomenon is along similar lines as Marsha Linehan's account of Dialectical Behavior Therapy and Radical Acceptance. To move away from the "over-willfulness" mindset (which can be equated to "self will run riot") to Radical Acceptance, Linehan advocates turning the mind and allowing willingness to happen, similar to asking "Will I?". Willingness leads to radical acceptance, which in turn, can cause more permanent change.

Experimental data
One experiment compared the performance of two groups of people doing anagrams. One group thought about their impending anagram task; the other thought about whether or not they would perform anagrams. The second group performed better than those who knew for sure that they would be working on anagrams. The same researcher, Ibrahim Senay (at University of Illinois in Urbana), found similarly that repeatedly writing the question "Will I?" was more powerful than writing the traditional affirmation "I will".

Willpower and addiction 
Michael J. Taleff writes, "Willpower in our field (psychology) is a paradox". Addiction affected patients are told that willfulness is less effective than willingness.

See also

 Paradox of hedonism

References

External links

Why Making Profit Your Goal May Be a Bad Idea
Obliquity, Financial Times, 17 January 2004
Is There a Secret to Willpower?
The Willpower Trick

Decision-making paradoxes
Autonomy
Psychological attitude